The McDonaldization of Society is a 1993 book by sociologist George Ritzer. Ritzer suggests that in the later part of the 20th century the socially-structured form of the fast-food restaurant has become the organizational force representing and extending the process of rationalization into the realm of everyday interaction and individual identity. McDonald's of the 1990s serves as the case model. The book introduced the term McDonaldization to learned discourse as a way to describe a social process which produces "mind-numbing sameness", according to a 2002 review of a related academic text.

In McDonaldization Ritzer expands and updates central elements from the work of Max Weber and produces a critical analysis of the impact of social-structural change on human interaction and identity. The central theme in Weber's analysis of modern society was the process of rationalization; a far-reaching process whereby traditional modes of thinking were replaced by an ends/means analysis concerned with efficiency and formalized social control. Weber argued that the archetypal manifestation of this process was the bureaucracy; a large, formal organization characterized by a hierarchical authority structure, well-established division of labor, written rules and regulations, impersonality and a concern for technical competence. Bureaucratic organizations not only represent the process of rationalization, the structure they impose on human interaction and thinking furthers the process, leading to an increasingly rationalized world. The process affects all aspects of everyday life.

See also
 McDonaldization
 Jihad vs. McWorld

References

1993 non-fiction books
Sociology books
Books about globalization
Ization
McWords
Social impact of advertising